The Handball events at the 2003 All-Africa Games were held in Abuja, Nigeria from 5 to 14 October 2003.

Qualified teams

Squads

Group stage
All times are local (UTC+1).

Group A

Group B

Classification matches
5–8th place bracket

7–8th place match

5–6th place match

Knockout stage

Semifinals

Third place match

Final

Final standing

References

 
2003 All-Africa Games
2003
African Games
Handball